Education in Georgia is free of charge and compulsory from the age of 6 until 17-18 years. In 1996, the gross primary enrollment rate was 88.2 percent, and the net primary enrollment rate was 87 percent; 48.8 percent are girls and 51.8 percent are boys. Constitution mandates that education is free. Related expenses that include textbooks and laptops are provided by the state free of charge; in 2001 there were 47,837 children not attending primary school.

The Human Rights Measurement Initiative (HRMI) finds that Georgia is fulfilling only 94.3% of what it should be fulfilling for the right to education based on the country's level of income. HRMI breaks down the right to education by looking at the rights to both primary education and secondary education. While taking into consideration Georgia's income level, the nation is achieving 90.7% of what should be possible based on its resources (income) for primary education and 97.8% for secondary education.

Education standards in Georgia 
Georgia is a part of the Lisbon Recognition Convention and Bologna Process, and therefore, the Georgian public education system (general, vocational, and higher) is fully compatible with international standards of education. Diplomas issued by Georgian public high schools, colleges, and higher education institutions offering BA, MA, and Ph.D. programs, are recognized by European countries and the USA.

See also
List of universities in Georgia

References

External links 
Ministry of Education and Science of Georgia